A Smile as Big as the Moon is a Hallmark Hall of Fame television movie. The film debuted on ABC on January 29, 2012.

John Corbett stars in this film based on the 2002 memoir of the same title by teacher Mike Kersjes and Joe Layden.  The movie shows the challenges Kersjes faced as he worked to bring out the best from his special education students by taking them to Space Camp, which had, until that time been perceived as a program best suited to advanced science and math students, well beyond the reach of special education students.   Several actors playing students in the film have Down syndrome, autism and/or learning disabilities.

Plot
Ben, a student with Down syndrome, in Mike Kersjes's Forest Hills Northern High School, Grand Rapids, Michigan, special education class, dreams of becoming an astronaut. Kersjes, who is also a football coach is inspired to pursue Space Camp for his students.  Obstacles mount as school administrators object to the expense and Space Camp officials have no experience with special-ed students.  Teacher Robynn McKinney supports Kersjes's efforts.

Eventually the trip is approved by the necessary parties, and Kersjes faces another set of challenges: fundraising, preparing the students for their trip with science and physical education, and battling bullying and belittling from other students.  Kersjes engages the football team in these endeavors.

Filming
The film was shot primarily in Wilmington, North Carolina and at United States Space Camp in Huntsville, Alabama. One scene used Sky Theater inside Ingram Planetarium of Sunset Beach, North Carolina, which was adapted to appear as a planetarium would have in 1988. Filming took place there September 28, 2011.

Cast
 John Corbett as Mike Kersjes: A high school special education teacher who takes his class to Space Camp
 Jessy Schram as Robynn McKinney
 Cynthia Watros as Dr. Deborah Barnhart
 Logan Huffman as Scott Goudy: A boy with Dyslexia and anger management problems who hates being in special ed.
 Breezy Eslin as Stephanie Reinks: A girl with ADD and Bipolar disorder. She is also never one to let anything slide.
 Abigale Coorigan as Lisa Casey: A girl with ADHD and OCD. She is also the class tattletale.
 Peter ten Brink as Ben Schmidt: A boy with Down syndrome.
 David Lambert as Steve Bennett: A boy with ADHD and Tourette syndrome. He is the most hyperactive student in the class.
 Jimmy Bellinger as Matt Snyder: A boy with Autism. He is a whiz of mathematics and science.
 Kesun Loder (K'Sun Ray) as Lewis Dayhuff: A boy with Dyslexia. He lives with his 13th foster family, and also had a temper that made Scott seem tame.
 Tyrin Niles Wyche as Jamal Davis: A boy who is mentally slow and slow to get agitated. He is the most quiet student.
 Tanner Dow as Adam Plowright: A boy with Autism and OCD. He is the class gentle giant with a "heart that matches his size".
 E. Roger Mitchell as Tom Keller: The principal at Forest Hills Northern High School.
 Keith Flippen as Dennis Schmidt: The father of Ben Schmidt.
 Moira Kelly as Darcy Kersjes: The wife of Mike Kersjes.
 Mike Pniewski as Big Dan: The owner of a fast food restaurant called Big Dan's Burger Shed.
 Louise Linton as Julie: The counselor for the team "Big Dan's Burger Shed".
 Fred Griffith as Judge

References

External links
 

2012 television films
2012 films
Hallmark Hall of Fame episodes
Films shot at the U.S. Space & Rocket Center
Films shot in North Carolina
Films shot in Alabama
Space camps
Special education
Television Academy Honors winners
Films directed by James Steven Sadwith